Events in the year 2003 in Mexico.

Incumbents

Federal government
 President: Vicente Fox 

 Interior Secretary (SEGOB): Santiago Creel
 Secretary of Foreign Affairs (SRE)
Jorge Castañeda Gutman, until January 10
Luis Ernesto Derbez, starting January 15
 Communications Secretary (SCT): Pedro Cerisola
 Education Secretary (SEP): Reyes Tamez
 Secretary of Defense (SEDENA): Gerardo Clemente Vega
 Secretary of Navy (SEMAR): Marco Antonio Peyrot González
 Secretary of Labor and Social Welfare (STPS): José Carlos María Abascal Carranza
 Secretary of Welfare (SEDESOL): Josefina Vázquez Mota
 Secretary of Tourism (SECTUR)
Leticia Navarro, until July 29
Rodolfo Elizondo Torres, starting July 29
 Secretary of the Environment (SEMARNAT)
Víctor Lichtinger, until June
Alberto Cárdenas, starting June
 Secretary of Health (SALUD): Julio Frenk
Attorney General of Mexico (PRG): Rafael Macedo de la Concha

Supreme Court

 President of the Supreme Court: Mariano Azuela Güitrón

Governors

 Aguascalientes: Felipe González González 
 Baja California: Eugenio Elorduy Walther 
Baja California Sur: Leonel Cota Montaño  
 Campeche
José Antonio González Curi, until September 15
Jorge Carlos Hurtado Valdez , starting September 16
 Chiapas: Pablo Salazar Mendiguchía 
 Chihuahua: Patricio Martínez García 
 Coahuila: Enrique Martínez y Martínez 
 Colima
Fernando Moreno Peña , until October 31
Carlos Flores Dueñas , interim governor November 1-December 31
 Durango: Ángel Sergio Guerrero Mier 
 Guanajuato: Juan Carlos Romero Hicks 
 Guerrero: René Juárez Cisneros 
 Hidalgo: Manuel Ángel Núñez Soto 
 Jalisco: Alberto Cárdenas 
 State of Mexico: Arturo Montiel 
 Michoacán: Lázaro Cárdenas Batel 
 Morelos: Sergio Estrada Cajigal Ramírez .
 Nayarit: Antonio Echevarría Domínguez
 Nuevo León: Fernando Canales Clariond 
 Oaxaca: José Murat Casab 
 Puebla: Melquíades Morales 
 Querétaro
Ignacio Loyola Vera , until September 30
Francisco Garrido Patrón , starting October 1
 Quintana Roo: Joaquín Hendricks Díaz 
 San Luis Potosí
Fernando Silva Nieto, until September 25
Jesús Marcelo de los Santos , Starting September 26
 Sinaloa: Juan S. Millán 
 Sonora
Armando López Nogales , until September 13
Eduardo Bours , starting September 13
 Tabasco: Manuel Andrade Díaz , starting January 1
 Tamaulipas: Tomás Yarrington 	
 Tlaxcala: Alfonso Sánchez Anaya 
 Veracruz: Miguel Alemán Velasco 
 Yucatán: Víctor Cervera Pacheco 
 Zacatecas: Ricardo Monreal 
Head of Government of the Federal District: Andrés Manuel López Obrador

Events
 Fahrenheit has its first issue published. 
 The Chiapas Bridge is finished with being constructed. 
 The México Posible party is founded and dissolved. 
 January 21: 2003 Colima earthquake. 
 March 13: Instituto Nacional de Lenguas Indígenas is created. 
 June 2: The Escuela Preparatoria Tlalpan II "Otilio Montaño" is inaugurated. 
 July 5: The National Commission for the Development of Indigenous Peoples goes into effect. 
 July 6: 2003 Mexican legislative election 
 September: World Trade Organization Ministerial Conference of 2003 in Cancun. 
 September 5: Nuestra Belleza México 2003.
 September 28: Optibús starts operations. 
 November 15: Miss Latin America 2004 held in Cancun.
 November 27: the Monterrey Arena is opened. 
 December 9 – 11: The United Nations Convention against Corruption is opened for signing in Mérida, Yucatán.
 December 22: Counter-terrorism base Ixtoc-Alfa is founded by the Mexican Navy.

Hurricanes
 June 26 – 27: Tropical Storm Carlos (2003) 
 June 29 – July 2: Tropical Storm Bill (2003) 
 July 8 – 17: Hurricane Claudette (2003) 
 August 14 – 17: Hurricane Erika (2003) 
 August 22 – 27: Hurricane Ignacio (2003) 
 September 8 – 24: Hurricane Marty (2003) 
 October 1 – 6: Tropical Storm Larry (2003)

Awards	

	
Belisario Domínguez Medal of Honor	- Luis González y González
Order of the Aztec Eagle	
National Prize for Arts and Sciences	
National Public Administration Prize	
Ohtli Award
 Marco A. López Jr.
 Patricia Madrid

Sport

 Primera División de México Clausura 2003
 Primera División de México Apertura 2003 
 Mexico win the 2003 CONCACAF Gold Cup
 2003 Centrobasket held in Culiacán 
 2003 Centrobasket Women 
 2003 Mexican Figure Skating Championships 
 2003 Gran Premio Telmex-Gigante 
 2003 MasterCard Truck Series season 
 2003 Tecate Telmex Monterrey Grand Prix 
 Homenaje a Dos Leyendas: El Santo y Salvador Lutteroth (2003) 
 2003 IIHF World U18 Championship Division III co-hosted with Bosnia 
 2003 Men's NORCECA Volleyball Championship Culiacan, Sinaloa 
 2003 Women's Pan-American Volleyball Cup Saltillo, Coahuila 
 2003 Central American and Caribbean Cross Country Championships 
 Mexico at the 2003 Pan American Games 
 2003 Pan American Race Walking Cup from San Diego, California, United States to Tijuana, Baja California. 
 C.F. Mérida founded. 
 Tijuana Dragons founded. 
 Monterrey Fury founded.

Film

 List of Mexican films of 2003

Births

 January 16 – Adriana Hernández, rhythmic gymnast
 May 8 – Joaquín Bondoni, singer, songwriter and actor
 September 18 – Ana Galindo, rhythmic gymnast

Deaths
February 11: Socorro Avelar, actress (b. 1925)
 June 10: Alfredo Guati Rojo watercolor artist (b. December 1, 1918)
 November 1: Humberto Briseño Sierra, Mexican lawyer (b. 1914)
November 6: Eduardo Palomo, actor (Corazón salvaje (1993 TV series)) (b. 1962)

References

 
Years of the 21st century in Mexico
2000s in Mexico
Mexico
Mexico